"Heer" (Urdu: ہیر, literal English translation: "pure") is an instrumental song by the Pakistani sufi rock band Junoon. The instrumental was first released on the band's self-titled debut album, Junoon released in 1991 and later in the fourth studio album, Azadi released in 1997. The instrumental is composed by the band's lead guitarist Salman Ahmad. The instrumental uses blending of rock guitars and bluesy vocals with eastern elements like the use of tablas, raga-inspired melodies and traditional Pakistani folk music.

In concerts, the song has been frequently performed by Junoon as an intro to their song "Heeray". The music video of the instrumental single is based on the famous poem Heer Ranjha by Waris Shah, it is also one of the popular tragic romances of the Punjab. It tells the story of the love of Heer and her lover Ranjha.

In addition, the instrumental song has also featured in the compilation album Kashmakash, released in 1995. "Heer" was named at #4 in a list of Junoon's top 10 songs published by Gibson Guitar on their website.

Music video
The music video of the instrumental single "Heer" by Junoon is based on one of the famous tragic romances of the Punjab, Heer Ranjha. The video starts off with the sun rising and then a clip of a female dancer dancing in traditional sufi manner. Afterwards, Salman Ahmad is seen playing his guitar with a tabla player in several scenes in the music video. In the middle of the video, the story of the love of Heer and her lover Ranjha begins with several scenes showing Salman Ahmad playing his lead guitar and several shots of the female dancer performing traditional sufi dance. Several scenes are shown with Heer and Ranjha secretly meeting each other but Heer's family finds it out and then Heer is shown in grieve, heartbroken. In the end, several men are seen beating Ranjha and Heer could be seen crying and asking them to stop beating Ranjha. The video ends with Heer as she attempts suicide by killing her own self with a knife after seeing her lover Ranjha brutally killed by her own family.

Track listing
Heer

Cover versions
 2011: Shahjehan Khan (covered an instrumental version of the song on Junoon's 20th anniversary album)

Personnel

Junoon
Ali Azmat - lead vocals, backing vocals
Salman Ahmad - backing vocals, lead guitar
Brian O'Connell - bass guitar, backing vocals

Additional musicians
Ustad Ashiq Ali Mir - tablas

References

External links
 Junoon Official Website

1991 singles
Junoon (band) songs
1991 songs
EMI Records singles
Songs written by Salman Ahmad